Merle is the surname of:

Carole Merle (born 1964), French former alpine skier
Foulques du Merle (died 1314), Marshal of France
Frank Merle (mathematician) (born 1962), French mathematician
Georges Merle (1851–1886), French painter
Guy du Merle (1908–1993), French aeronautical engineer, test pilot and writer
Hugues Merle (1823–1881), French painter; father of Georges Merle
Matthieu Merle (c. 1548 – after 1587), Huguenot captain in the Wars of Religion
Olivier Merle (born 1965), French former rugby union footballer
Pierre Hugues Victoire Merle (1766–1830), French general of the Napoleonic Wars
Robert Merle (1908–2004), French novelist